Steve, Steven or Stephen Lacey may refer to:

Stephen Lacey, rediscoverer of the Comb sort algorithm
Stephen Lacey (author), from Point Clare, New South Wales
Steve Lacey, singer
Steven Lacey, racing driver in the 2012 Australian Sports Sedan season

See also
Steve Lacy (disambiguation)